Samakkhi Prathet Thai or 'Samakki Thailand is the twenty-fourth album by Thai rock band Carabao. It was released in March 2005.

The album was released amidst the flaring up of the South Thailand insurgency. It thus promoted a message of national solidarity in many of its songs, including the eponymous "Samakkhi Prathet Thai". In particular, "Khwan Thai Chai Nueng Diao", which had been previously released as a single, was purposely written to reach out to the restive South. The single version featured 43 artists, as well as Princess Ubol Ratana.

Track listing

References

2005 albums
Carabao (band) albums